Carly Boag (born 4 September 1991) is an Australian basketball player, who currently plays for the Bendigo Spirit in the WNBL.

College
Boag played college basketball for the Minot State Beavers in Minot, North Dakota, participating in NCAA Division II.

Professional career

Europe
Boag began her professional career in Pleyber-Christ, France, for the 2014–15 season with Leon Tregor Basket 29 in Ligue Féminine de Basketball 2.

In 2019, Boag joined Espoo Basket in Finland's Naisten Korisliiga for the 2019–20 season.

WNBL
Boag began her WNBL career in her home state of New South Wales, with the Sydney Uni Flames in 2015. Boag has re-signed with the Flames for the 2016–17 season, her second consecutive season in Sydney.

In 2020, Boag was signed to return to the Sydney Uni Flames for the 2020–21 season. This will be her fourth season with the Flames, and first since 2018.

References

1991 births
Living people
Australian women's basketball players
Australian expatriate basketball people in the United States
College women's basketball players in the United States
Forwards (basketball)
Minot State University alumni
People from Tamworth, New South Wales
Sportswomen from New South Wales
Sydney Uni Flames players